21 Ramadan is the twenty-first day of the ninth month (Ramadan) of the Islamic calendar.

In the conventional Lunar Hijri calendar, this day is the 257th day of the year.

Deaths

 40 AH – Ali ibn Abi Talib, the first Imam of Shiites and the fourth Caliph of Sunnis
 726 AH - Osman I, the founder of the Ottoman dynasty
 1104 AH - Al-Hurr al-Amili, a Shia scholar and Faqih, author of Wasa'il al-Shia
 1028 AH - Seyyed Majed Hosseini Bahrani, a Shia scholar, Faqih and poet
 Moses - Prophet of the Israelites (according to the narrations)
 Joshua - Moses' assistant and his successor (according to the narrations)

Events
 40 AH - The beginning of the caliphate of Hasan ibn Ali, the older son of Ali and Fatimah, and a grandson of the Islamic prophet Muhammad, the second Shi'i Imam
 40 AH - The allegiance of the people of Kufa to Hasan ibn Ali for the caliphate
 40 AH - Retribution of Abd al-Rahman ibn Muljam, the killer of Ali (1st Imam of Shia)
 The day of the revelation of the Quran, holy book of Islam (according to persian narrations)

Holidays and observances
 The second Qadr Night of Ramadan according to Shiites, holding an official nightlife worship ceremony called Ehya night in Iran
 Day of martyrdom of Imam Ali, an official holiday in Iran

See also
 19 Ramadan
 23 Ramadan
 13 Rajab

References

Islamic calendar